The 1957–58 Iraq Central FA First Division Cup was the 10th season of the Iraq Central FA League (the top division of football in Baghdad and its neighbouring cities from 1948 to 1973). It was played as a double-elimination tournament and started on 26 November 1957.

Al-Quwa Al-Jawiya Al-Malakiya (now known as Al-Quwa Al-Jawiya) won their first title, after Montakhab Al-Shorta withdrew from the replay of the final due to missing several players from their squad through injury with the Iraq Central Football Association refusing to move the game to another date. Al-Quwa Al-Jawiya Al-Malakiya's Edison David was the player of the tournament.

Final positions

First round

Second round

Winners bracket

Losers bracket

Al-Kuliya Al-Askariya Al-Malakiya eliminated

Al-Liwa Al-Thamin eliminated

Third round

Losers bracket

Al-Athori eliminated

Al-Adhamiya eliminated

Semi-finals

Winners bracket

Losers bracket

The match was ended at the beginning of the second half after Al-Numan withdrew in protest at the goal being awarded
Al-Numan eliminated

Maslahat Naqil Al-Rukab eliminated

Final

Montakhab Al-Shorta withdrew from the replay of the final due to several key players from their squad being unavailable through injury. The Iraq Central Football Association, refusing to move the game to another date, therefore awarded Al-Quwa Al-Jawiya Al-Malakiya a walkover victory and the title.

Bracket

References

External links
 Iraqi Football Website

Iraq Central FA League seasons
Iraq
1957 in Iraqi sport
1958 in Iraqi sport